Perfect Beyond is a 2014 Chinese comedy-drama film directed by Yin Bo. It was released in China on January 5, 2014.

Cast
Yan Shuo
Ji Chen
Liu Siyou
Wang Maolei
Mu Xing
Yao Xingzhu
Zhang Yichen

Reception
The film earned ¥2.32 million at the Chinese box office.

References

2014 comedy-drama films
Chinese comedy-drama films